Keiferia georgei is a moth in the family Gelechiidae. It was described by Ronald W. Hodges in 1985. It is found in North America, where it has been recorded from Illinois.

The larvae feed on Physalis heterophylla var. ambigua. They mine the leaves of their host plant. The mine has the form of a blotch mine that has been found on all parts of the leaf, but also in buds and in tied leaves. Silk and frass are deposited externally and larvae move freely to new mines and leaves.

References

Keiferia
Moths described in 1985